Monument Rocks (also Chalk Pyramids) are a series of large chalk formations in Gove County, Kansas, rich in fossils. The formations were the first landmark in Kansas chosen by the US Department of the Interior as a National Natural Landmark. The carbonate deposits were laid down during the Cretaceous Period in what was then the Western Interior Seaway, which split the continent of North America into two landmasses. They are estimated to have been formed 80 million years ago.

History
On January 29, 2008, Monument Rocks, 25 miles south of Oakley, Kansas, and Castle Rock, 31 miles to the east, were jointly named as one of the 8 Wonders of Kansas.

Gallery

See also
Other geological formations in Kansas:
Castle Rock (Kansas)
Little Jerusalem Badlands State Park
Mushroom Rock State Park
Rock City, Kansas
Big Basin Prairie Preserve

References

Further reading

External links
Monument Rocks (Chalk Pyramids)
Monument Rocks/Rock Pyramids
Monument Rocks
Gove County Map, KDOT

Natural arches of Kansas
Landforms of Gove County, Kansas
National Natural Landmarks in Kansas
Landmarks in Kansas
Tourist attractions in Gove County, Kansas